Eydie in Love is a 1958 album by Eydie Gormé with arrangements by Don Costa. The album was nominated for the Grammy Award for Best Vocal Performance, Female at the 1st Annual Grammy Awards.

Track listing
 "When the World Was Young" (Johnny Mercer) – 3:54  
 "In Love In Vain" (Jerome Kern, Leo Robin) – 3:12  
 "Here I Am In Love Again" (Moose Charlap)– 3:20  
 "Why Shouldn't I?" (Cole Porter) – 2:50
 "In the Wee Small Hours of the Morning" (Bob Hilliard, David Mann) – 2:57
 "Love Letters" (Victor Young, (Edward Heyman) – 3:12
 "Fly Me to the Moon (In Other Words)" (Bart Howard) – 3:04
 "When I Fall in Love" (Victor Young, Edward Heyman) – 2:56
 "Idle Conversation" (Johnny Burke) – 2:42
 "Why Try to Change Me Now?" (Cy Coleman, Joseph McCarthy) – 3:28
 "Impossible" (Steve Allen) – 3:15
 "It Could Happen to You" (Jimmy Van Heusen, Johnny Burke) – 3:17

Personnel
Eydie Gormé – vocals
Don Costa – arranger

References

External links

1958 albums
Albums arranged by Don Costa
Eydie Gormé albums
ABC Records albums